The Man Without a Country is a 1973 American made-for-television drama film based on the short story "The Man Without a Country" by Edward Everett Hale.

Plot
A man damns his country and is sentenced to spend the rest of his life in exile.

Cast

Production
Rosemont spent three years trying to raise finance. He spent $16,000 of his own money to prepare a visual presentation of the film and arranged for a script for be written by Sidney Carroll. During the course of research he discovered that the book was not based on a true story although it was inspired by the Aaron Burr conspiracy.

He eventually succeeded in getting sponsorship from Eastman Kodak.

"Casting was so essential," said Rosemont. "We had to find an actor who could age 60 years on screen. The makeup was the easiest. Making him look young was the hardest."

Rosemont approached Cliff Robertson, although the actor had not done television for years. "But when he saw our research it turned him on." he said. "It's a dream part for an actor."

Cliff Robertson signed to make the film in August 1972 and filming began in September. "We had to change our schedule to fit Cliff's," said Rosemont. "It cost me a lot of money but it was worth it."

Filming took place in Mystic, Connecticut, Newport, Rhode Island and Fort Niagara, New York.

Filming was expensive. "I do my own work," said Rosemont. "If there's a deficit I pay for it. My money is on the line. I put it on screen. Hopefully it will enjoy many repeats; it's an ageless story, a potential TV perennial."

Locations
In the summer of 1972, the replica of HMS Rose (later renamed HMS Surprise for another film) was hired for the film, a made-for-television production. Norman Rosemont Productions was unable to find the money to take the ship out sailing, so all the filming was shot with sails set, as the ship was securely moored to the pier, next to the causeway to Goat Island. During filming Cliff Robertson had to hide that he had a broken leg at the time.

Awards
The film was nominated for Best Cinematography for Entertainment Programming – For a Special or Feature Length Program Made for Television at the 26th Primetime Emmy Awards.

References

External links

1973 television films
1973 films
1973 drama films
American drama television films
Films directed by Delbert Mann
Films scored by Jack Elliott
ABC Movie of the Week
1970s English-language films
1970s American films
English-language drama films